The Church Times is an independent Anglican weekly newspaper based in London and published in the United Kingdom on Fridays.

History 

The Church Times was founded on 7 February 1863 by George Josiah Palmer, a printer. It fought for the Anglo-Catholic cause in the Church of England at a time when priests were being harried and imprisoned over such matters as lighting candles on altars and wearing vestments, which brought them into conflict with the Public Worship Regulation Act 1874, intended to "put down" ritualism in the Church of England. The paper defended the spiritual independence of the Church of England in spite of the Church's Established status. Many of the ceremonial and doctrinal matters that the paper championed are now accepted as part of mainstream Anglicanism.

Since the mid-1950s, the paper's sympathies have broadened, embracing the principle of diversity of practice in the worldwide Anglican Communion, and looking more favourably on other Christian denominations. The paper carries more editorial and advertising than any of its main rivals for an Anglican readership.

The paper has always been independent of the church hierarchy. From its foundation until 1989 it was owned by the Palmer family, ending with Bernard Palmer, who combined the tasks of owner and editor for the final 20 years. He sold it to the charity Hymns Ancient and Modern, then chaired by Henry Chadwick.

Throughout its life, it has scrutinised the actions of the church hierarchy, besides covering the work of the parishes. It has provided extensive coverage of meetings of the Church of England's central bodies, including the Convocations, the Church Assembly, and the General Synod. Its published annual Indexes have always described it as an "ecclesiastical and general" newspaper, and it has always included world events in its coverage. Much of its space has always been given over to serious book reviews, and, more recently, coverage of the arts.

The paper's regular columnists include Paul Vallely, the former associate editor of The Independent, the poet and priest Malcolm Guite, and the priest and broadcaster Angela Tilby. Giles Fraser, the priest and media commentator, was a regular columnist from 2004 to 2013. The author Ronald Blythe wrote the "Word from Wormingford" column from 1993 to 2017. Edward Heath was the paper's news editor from February 1948 to September 1949.

It has been nicknamed (mainly among Anglo-Catholics since the 1970s or 80s) "Jezebel's Trumpet" (alluding to Jezebel the wife of King Ahab of Israel; II Kings).

In February 2013, the Church Times marked its 150th anniversary.

In April 2014, the paper published an article by David Cameron. He wrote: "I am a member of the Church of England, and, I suspect, a rather classic one: not that regular in attendance, and a bit vague on some of the more difficult parts of the faith. But that doesn't mean the Church of England doesn't matter to me or people like me: it really does."

In the run-up to the 2017 general election, the leaders of the three main political parties wrote for the paper on the importance of international development.

It has published many interviews with high-profile figures, inside and outside the Church, including Justin Welby, Terry Waite Jeremy Vine, Marilynne Robinson, Francis Spufford, Derren Brown, Rhidian Brook, Jon McGregor, Joan Bakewell, Sarah Perry and Tom Holland

The paper was named Niche Newspaper of the Year at the 2009 at the national Newspaper Awards, and won the award for Best Use of Colour in 2010.

In November 2017, the paper's deputy news and features editor, Madeleine Davies, received an award from the Awareness Foundation for "her extraordinary work in the Christian media; her great courage and integrity as a source of inspiration and encouragement to people of faith everywhere." The award was presented by Sophie, Countess of Wessex. Previous winners have included the BBC's Middle East Editor, Jeremy Bowen and Baroness Berridge.

In April 2018, the Archbishop of Canterbury awarded the paper's former Education Correspondent, Margaret Holness, the Canterbury Cross for Services to the Church of England, "for sustained excellence as Education Correspondent of the Church Times for over twenty years".

A weekly podcast was launched in March 2017. Interviewees have included Vicky Beeching, Rob Bell, John Gray (philosopher)., Neil MacGregor, N.T. Wright and Sarah Perry.

In January 2018, the paper's design was updated. Editor Paul Handley wrote in the paper: "We ... want to make more of the fact that the print version of the Church Times now works very much in tandem with our website and social-media activity. Many readers, besides downloading our weekly app, now go to our website for breaking stories throughout the week, or to read a fuller version of the stories that appear in print." The Starbridge Lecturer in Theology and Natural Sciences at the University of Cambridge, the Revd Dr Andrew Davison, wrote on Twitter: "Admiring the impressive new look of @ChurchTimes, I am reminded how central that newspaper is to our life in the @c_of_e, as a source of news, education, and untrammelled comment and discussion."

In March 2018, a promotional video was released. In the video, Madeleine Davies says: "I think what’s really important about the Church Times is it's independent. We're not affiliated to any other organisation, so we're really free in what we can write." The editor, Paul Handley, says: “If the Church screws up, then we report it. If the Church does something fantastic, then we report it. We deliberately don’t have our own agenda.”

The Church Times holds a number of festivals and events. In recent years these have included the Church Times Festival of Faith and Literature, the Church Times Festival of Poetry, the Festival of Preaching, and The Parish: Has it had its day? It also organises the Church Times Green Health Awards.

In recent years the newspaper has taken a leading role in sponsoring the Greenbelt festival. 

Since 1951, the paper has hosted an inter-diocesan cricket competition, the Church Times Cricket Cup.

Editors 

George J. Palmer (1863–1887)
 Henry J. Palmer (1887–1914)
 E. Hermitage Day (1915–24)
Sidney Dark (1924–41)
Leonard Prestige (1941–47)
Humphry Beevor (1947–50; later Bishop of Lebombo)
Rosamund Essex (1950–60))
Roger L. Roberts (1960–68)
Bernard Palmer (1969–89)
John Whale (1989–95; former BBC head of religious programmes and Sunday Times writer)
Paul Handley (1995–present)

Contemporary contributors 

Paul Vallely
Malcolm Guite
Andrew Brown
Angela Tilby
 Angus Ritchie
Eve Poole (author)
Mark Oakley
Rowan Williams
Paula Gooder
Mark Vernon
Lucy Winkett
 Nick Spencer
 Malcolm Doney
 Andrew Davison
Philip North
Sam Wells
Richard Harries
Muriel Porter (Australia Correspondent)
Stephen Cottrell
David Martin (sociologist)
Sarah Coakley
John Saxbee
David Brown (theologian)
John Barton (theologian)
Graham James
John Inge
Peter Selby
Nicholas Sagovsky
Robin Gill (priest)
Peter Graystone
Simon Parke
Elaine Storkey
Alan Storkey
David Winter
Harriet Baber
 Madeleine Davies

Past contributors 

Felix Aprahamian
Jonathan Bartley
Ronald Blythe
Douglas Brown (BBC’s first religious affairs correspondent)
Gerald Butt (Middle East correspondent)
David Edwards (priest)
Giles Fraser
Monica Furlong
Elizabeth Goudge
Sir Edward Heath (news editor)
 Margaret Holness (Education Correspondent)
John Keble
J. N. D. Kelly
Patrick Maitland (later 17th Earl of Lauderdale)
Cole Moreton (news editor)
Donald Maxwell (artist)
Norman Nicholson
T. E. Utley
Alec Vidler
William Wand (former Bishop of London)
Martin Warner
N. T. Wright (later Bishop of Durham)
Charlotte Mary Yonge

Cartoonists 

Noel Ford
Dave Walker
Ron Wood
Dave Gaskill
Pete Dredge
Bill Caldwell

Historical 

The hymn “Onward, Christian Soldiers” was first published in the Church Times (15 October 1864).

Edward Heath, the future British Prime Minister, was news editor of the Church Times from February 1948 to September 1949. His work was “a mixture of administration, reporting, and sub-editing”. His assignments for the paper included covering the 1948 Anglo-Catholic Congress and Wand's Mission to London.

N. T. Wright (Tom Wright) was a weekly devotional columnist (Sunday’s Readings) from 1995 to 2000. He has said that writing the columns gave him the "courage" to embark upon his popular For Everyone (SPCK) series of commentaries on New Testament books.

References

External links 
Church Times website
Hymns Ancient & Modern website

Church of England publications
Publications established in 1863
Weekly newspapers published in the United Kingdom
Newspapers published in London
Anglican newspapers and magazines